Kussara (Kuššar) was a Middle Bronze Age kingdom in Anatolia. The kingdom, though apparently important at one time, is mostly remembered today as the origin of the dynasty that would form the Old Hittite Kingdom.

Location
Kussara is occasionally mentioned (as Ku-ša-ra) in the clay tablets of the Old Assyrian traders in Anatolia, and less often in the early Hittite Kingdom (as KUR URU Ku-uš-ša-ra). Hittite sources have little to offer on the context of Kussara, and since the city disappears out of political history at a very early date, the records of the Old Assyrian traders still constitute the only real indication for the location of the city. The borders of Kussara remain unknown, and the old city of Kussara has not yet been found. Several proposals for its placement have been advanced.

Massimo Forlanini, an expert in the geography of ancient Anatolia, has stated that Kussara was probably situated southeast of Kanesh, but presumably north of Luhuzzadia/Lahu(wa)zzandiya, between Hurama and Tegarama (modern day Gürün), perhaps on a road which was crossing another road to the north in the direction of Samuha.

Professor Trevor Bryce wrote "[t]he city of Kussara probably lay to the south-east of the Kizil Irmak basin in the anti-Taurus region, on or near one of the main trade routes from Assyria and perhaps in the vicinity of modern Şar (Comana Cappadocia)".

Another proposal for a location is in the mountainous area West of Eblistan.

Kussaran kings
Pithana and his son Anitta, forerunners of the later Hittite kings, are the only two recorded kings of Kussara. Their exploits are known chiefly from the so-called Anitta Text, one of the earliest inscriptions in the Hittite language as yet discovered.
Pithana took control over Kanesh (Neša) and its important trade centrum in roughly 1780 BC. The people later revolted against the rule of his son, Anitta, but Anitta crushed the revolt and made Kanesh his capital. Kussara itself, however, appears to have retained ceremonial importance. Anitta also defeated the polities of Zalpuwa and Hattum, after which he took the title of Great King. Most scholars also accept a further king, Labarna I, to be a member of the Kussaran dynasty.

It is notable that Hattusili I, recognized as one of the first Hittite kings, referred to himself as "man of Kussara", although his capital (from which he likely took his name) was Hattusa. Again, Kussara seems even then to have retained some importance, since this was where Hattusili called a council on his own succession.

Economy, language and government
The language or dialect of Kussara is neither found nor described in either the Assyrian or Hittite texts, but from the evidence of Old Assyrian trade tablets, it is known that a palace and a karum (Assyrian trade station) existed in the city. The Kings of Kussara became the Kings of Kanesh in the Karum IB period of Kanesh. Hattusili I and Hattusili III mentioned the origins of the Kings of the land of Hatti as Hattusili I styled himself: "man of Kussara . . . Great King Tabarna, Hattusili the Great King, King of the land of Hatti." No other town or land was ever mentioned by a King of Hattusa as the origin of the Kings of Hattusa.

Because the Kings of Kussara and their clan formed the base of the Old Kingdom of the Hittites, the Hittite language (known as 'Nesili' to its speakers after the city of Kanesh or Nesa) was the language of the ruling officials. It is assumed that the language of Kussara was Indo-European, because if it were not, many more non-Indo-European elements would be expected in its apparent successor, Hittite.  Craig Melchert concluded in the chapter "Prehistory" of his book The Luwians (2003–17): "Hittite core vocabulary remains Indo-European".  The Anitta Text records that when Pithana captured Kanesh, he did no harm to it, but made the inhabitants "his mothers and fathers."  Some scholars have taken this unique statement to mean there were cultural and/or ethnic affinities between Kussara and Kanesh.

References

Sources

External links

 
Former populated places in Turkey
Lost ancient cities and towns